|}

The Grimes Hurdle is a Grade 3 National Hunt novice hurdle race in Ireland which is open to horses aged four years or older. 
It is run at Tipperary over a distance of 2 miles (3,218 metres), and it is scheduled to take place each year in July.

The race was first run in 2001 (as the Betdaq Hurdle) and was awarded Grade 3 status in 2006.

In line with several races at Tipperary, the race is named (since 2006) after a horse owned by J. P. McManus, Grimes, who won the inaugural running of this race. The same horse, Grimes, was previously celebrated (2003) in the name of the Tipperary race now known as the Like A Butterfly Novice Chase.

The race is sponsored by the company owned by J. P. McManus's younger brother, Kevin McManus Bookmakers.

Records
Most successful horse (2 wins):
 Accordion Etoile – 2004, 2005

Leading jockey (4 wins):
 Paul Townend – Simenon (2014), Thomas Hobson (2019), Aramon (2020), Sole Pretender (2021)

Leading trainer (5 wins): 
 Willie Mullins – Simenon (2014), Diakali (2015), Ivan Gronzy (2016), Thomas Hobson (2019), Aramon (2020)

Winners

See also
 Horse racing in Ireland
 List of Irish National Hunt races

References
Racing Post:

National Hunt hurdle races
National Hunt races in Ireland
Tipperary Racecourse
Recurring sporting events established in 2001
2001 establishments in Ireland